Claudiano Bezerra da Silva (born 16 May 1981), known as Kaká, is a Brazilian professional footballer who plays as a centre-back.

Club career
Kaká was born in São José do Belmonte, Pernambuco. Until 2006 he was on contract to União Bandeirante Futebol Clube, also being loaned to several modest Brazilian clubs. For 2006–07 he made the move to Europe, joining Portuguese side Académica de Coimbra and being an undisputed starter in his second season in the Primeira Liga (all 30 games played, 2,700 minutes of action), as they finished in 12th position.

In May 2008, Kaká signed with Bundesliga's Hertha BSC for €1.9 million. He made his debut in the competition on 17 August, playing the full 90 minutes in a 2–0 away win against Eintracht Frankfurt, and finished his debut campaign with 12 matches. After only appearing twice for the Berlin-based team in the first half of 2009–10 – the season eventually ended in relegation – he was loaned to AC Omonia in Cyprus on 31 January 2010, helping it win the First Division title for the first time in seven years.

Kaká continued to be rarely played at Hertha after his return and, in another winter transfer window move, returned to Portugal and joined S.C. Braga, yet on loan. With the Minho club he established himself as a regular, finishing the 2010–11 season with 20 competitive appearances, including eight in the team's UEFA Europa League run to the final, with the player taking the field in the decisive game against FC Porto (1–0 loss).

At the end of the season, Kaká returned to Hertha. On the last day of the 2011 summer transfer window he was once again loaned, this time to Cypriot champions and UEFA Champions League contenders APOEL FC. Kaká made his debut in the Champions League on 19 October 2011 in a 1–1 draw with Porto at the Estádio do Dragão. He added a further three appearances in the competition as they eventually became the first Cypriot club to reach both the knockout stages and the quarter-finals for the first time ever.

On 28 August 2012, Kaká signed with Hungarian side Videoton FC. In late January of the following year he moved to La Liga, loaned to Deportivo de La Coruña, and the move was made permanent in July.

Kaká signed an 18-month contract with APOEL on 29 January 2014, returning to his former club after one and a half years. He made his debut on 9 February, coming on as an 84th-minute substitute in a 2–1 league home victory over Apollon Limassol, and scored his first goal one week later in his team's 3–1 defeat of Alki Larnaca FC.

On 17 May 2014, in the league title decider between AEL Limassol and APOEL, Kaká suffered a head injury when he was hit by a firecracker launched by the opposition's fans; the match was abandoned in the 51st minute when the score was still at 0–0, and replayed 15 days later. He eventually helped his team to the national championship, adding the domestic cup.

Kaká returned to Portugal in its top tier in the 2015 off-season, joining newly promoted C.D. Tondela.

Club statistics

Honours
Omonia
Cypriot First Division: 2009–10

Braga
UEFA Europa League runner-up: 2010–11

APOEL
Cypriot First Division: 2013–14, 2014–15
Cypriot Cup: 2013–14, 2014–15

References

External links
APOEL official profile

1981 births
Living people
Sportspeople from Pernambuco
Brazilian footballers
Association football defenders
União Bandeirante Futebol Clube players
Associação Desportiva São Caetano players
Boa Esporte Clube players
Luverdense Esporte Clube players
Primeira Liga players
Liga Portugal 2 players
Campeonato de Portugal (league) players
Associação Académica de Coimbra – O.A.F. players
S.C. Braga players
C.D. Tondela players
Varzim S.C. players
Anadia F.C. players
Bundesliga players
2. Bundesliga players
Hertha BSC players
Cypriot First Division players
AC Omonia players
APOEL FC players
Nemzeti Bajnokság I players
Fehérvár FC players
La Liga players
Segunda División players
Deportivo de La Coruña players
Brazilian expatriate footballers
Expatriate footballers in Portugal
Expatriate footballers in Germany
Expatriate footballers in Cyprus
Expatriate footballers in Hungary
Expatriate footballers in Spain
Brazilian expatriate sportspeople in Portugal
Brazilian expatriate sportspeople in Germany
Brazilian expatriate sportspeople in Cyprus
Brazilian expatriate sportspeople in Hungary
Brazilian expatriate sportspeople in Spain